Spilonema is a genus of lichen-forming fungi in the family Coccocarpiaceae. The genus was circumscribed by Jean-Baptiste Édouard Bornet in 1856.

Species
Spilonema americanum 
Spilonema japonicum 
Spilonema maritimum  – Alaska
Spilonema paradoxum 
Spilonema revertens

References

Peltigerales
Peltigerales genera
Lichen genera
Taxa named by Jean-Baptiste Édouard Bornet
Taxa described in 1856